Henri Decaisne (27 January 1799 – 17 October 1852) was a Belgian historical and portrait painter.

Biography
Decaisne was born at Brussels in 1799. As early as 1814 he began to study painting under François, and in 1818 upon the advice of David he went to Paris and entered the studio of Girodet, whence he removed to that of Gros. Several pictures by him are at Versailles; among them are the 'Entry of Charles VII into Rouen' (1838), and the 'Institution of the Order of St. John of Jerusalem' (1842). In 1839 he completed his colossal work, ' Les Belges Illustres.' He died in Paris in 1852. Among his best works are:

Portraits
The Queen of the Belgians. 1835.
The Duke of Orleans. 1833.
The Princess Clementina of Orleans. 1833.
Madame Malibran as Desdemona. 1831. (pictured)
Victor Schœlcher. 1833.
Alphonse de Lamartine. 1839. (pictured)

Historical and other subjects
An Indian Family in Exile. 1824.
Milton dictating 'Paradise Lost' to his Daughter. 1827.
Charles I taking leave of his Children. 1827.
Cromwell and his Daughter. 1829.
Mater Dolorosa. 1835.
Hagar in the Desert. 1836.
The Guardian Angel. 1836. (His best work.) (pictured)
Charity. 1839.
The Adoration of the Shepherds. 1841.

References

External links

1799 births
1852 deaths
Belgian painters
Artists from Brussels
Pupils of Antoine-Jean Gros